Carmen is a 1931 British musical film directed by Cecil Lewis and starring Marguerite Namara, Thomas F. Burke and Lance Fairfax. It is an adaptation of the opera Carmen by Georges Bizet. It is also known by the alternative title of Gipsy Blood. It was produced by British International Pictures, the country's leading company of the early sound era, and shot at the Elstree Studios near London.

Cast
 Marguerite Namara as Carmen
 Thomas F. Burke as Don José
 Lance Fairfax as Escamillo
 Lester Matthews as Zuniga
 Mary Clare as Factory Girl
 Dennis Wyndham as Doncairo
 Lewin Mannering as Innkeeper
 Hay Petrie as Remenado

References

Bibliography
 Low, Rachael. Filmmaking in 1930s Britain. George Allen & Unwin, 1985.
 Wood, Linda. British Films, 1927-1939. British Film Institute, 1986.

External links

1931 films
Georges Bizet
British historical musical films
1930s historical musical films
Films shot at British International Pictures Studios
Films based on Carmen
Films set in the 19th century
Films set in Spain
British black-and-white films
Films based on adaptations
Films about Romani people
1930s English-language films
1930s British films